The Roman Catholic Diocese of Butuan (Lat: Dioecesis Butuanensis) is a diocese of the Latin Church of the  Roman Catholic Church in the Philippines.

History 
The Diocese was erected in 1967, through Pope Paul VI, separating from the Diocese of Surigao, the territory of the Diocese of Butuan is the Province of Agusan del Sur and Agusan del Norte and Most Rev. Carmelo Dominador Morelos became its first Bishop and the Diocese is a suffragan of the Archdiocese of Cagayan de Oro.

Coat of Arms
Vert, in between two pomegranates proper seeded Gules, supported, sculpted and leafed in two Or a bend wavy sinister Azure charged with a lily flower Argent.
Vert symbolized Agusan del Norte and Agusan del Sur. Pomegranates proper seeded inside the color Vert symbolized fertility. Color Azure is Agusan River. While Lily flower argent symbolized purity of St. Joseph the Patron of Butuan, and titular of the Diocese of Butuan.

Ordinaries

References

See also
Catholic Church in the Philippines
Butuan

Butuan
Butuan
Christian organizations established in 1967
Roman Catholic dioceses and prelatures established in the 20th century
Religion in Agusan del Norte
Butuan